Göteborg RF is a Swedish rugby union team in Gothenburg, Sweden. They currently play in Allsvenskan South.

History
The club was founded in 2007 by the amalgamation of Göteborg RK and Frölunda RK.

External links
 Göteborg RF

Swedish rugby union teams
Rugby union clubs in Gothenburg
Rugby clubs established in 2007
2007 establishments in Sweden